Raja of Mahmudabad is the title used by taluqdars of Mahmudabad Estate. The term may refer to following individuals:
 Raja Sarfaraz Ali Khan, first use, previous taluqdars used title Nawab
 Raja Musahib Ali Khan (d. 1810)
 Raja Mohammad Nawab Ali Khan (d. 1858)
 Raja Sir Mohammad Amir Hasan Khan (1849–1902)
 Raja Sir Mohammad Ali Mohammad Khan (1879–1932)
 Raja Sir Mohammad Amir Ahmad Khan (1914–1973), taluqadari abolished 1947
 Raja Mohammad Amir Mohammad Khan (current informal user)